The following shows the full results for the Singaporean general election, 1963:

References

Documentation of the districts in Singapore during the 1963 elections
singapore-elections.com's page on the elections

1963 Singaporean general election